François d'Aubert (born 31 October 1943, in Boulogne-Billancourt) is a French politician.

He is an auditor at the Court of Audit. From 2002, he was minister delegate to research in Jean-Pierre Raffarin's government.

From 26 July 2007 to 16 April 2009, he was president of the Cité des Sciences et de l'Industrie.

External links

Official page

1943 births
Living people
Politicians of the French Fifth Republic
Lycée Louis-le-Grand alumni
HEC Paris alumni
Sciences Po alumni
École nationale d'administration alumni
French Ministers of Budget
Officers of the Ordre national du Mérite
The Republicans (France) politicians
Deputies of the 12th National Assembly of the French Fifth Republic